Kazuo Hanaoka (born: 11 February 1949) is a sailor from Japan. who represented his country at the 1988 Summer Olympics in Busan, South Korea as crew member in the Soling. With helmsman Kazunori Komatsu and fellow crew members Tadashi Ikeda they took the 11th place.

References

Living people
1949 births
Sailors at the 1976 Summer Olympics – Flying Dutchman
Sailors at the 1988 Summer Olympics – Soling
Olympic sailors of Japan
Japanese male sailors (sport)